Harrow RFC are an English rugby union club that are based in Stanmore in London.  They currently play in London 3 North West - a league at tier 8 of the English rugby union system - following their relegation from London 2 North West at the end of the 2017–18 season.

History/Background 

Founded in 1891 Harrow RFC has been a constant presence in the community and a successful rugby club for players of all ages. The club has been at Grove Field, Wood Lane, Stanmore since 1953 and continues to attract members, supporters and players from the Harrow, Pinner, Edgware, Bushey and Watford region. The foremost club in the area, Harrow RFC is a well established member of the community and community rugby.

Harrow RFC is a Partner Club with Saracens. Players enjoy close contact including training with some of the game's leading players.

Harrow RFC has 15 teams competing in all age groups from Under 7 to Veterans. The Harrow 1st XV plays in the RFU London & SE Division in the London North West 3 Division.

Harrow RFC promotes high standards of Safety, Conduct and Coaching. The commitment to the all-volunteer club is such that the club has achieved the highest level of recognition for sports clubs.

Sponsors of Harrow RFC receive widespread recognition from the 300+ players, over 1000 members, supporters and parents and visiting teams throughout the 9 month rugby season as well as the benefit of supporting one of the leading community sports clubs in the whole region.

Club Honours

Herts/Middlesex 2 champions (2): 1996–97, 2011–12
Herts/Middlesex 4 champions: 2009–10
Herts/Middlesex 3 champions: 2010–11
Middlesex Senior Vase winners (2): 2011, 2013
Herts/Middlesex 1 champions: 2012–13
London 3 North West champions: 2013–14
London 2 North West champions: 2014–15

Kit 

Harrow plays in a blue and white, horizontally stripped top. With blue shorts, and blue and white socks.

See also
 Rugby Union

External links
 Harrow RFC Website

English rugby union teams